Capital Region Tourism was a tourism partnership in Wales which aims to promote tourism in the Cardiff Capital Region. CRT is based at the University of Wales Institute, Cardiff in the Penylan area of Cardiff. 

Cardiff is the most popular area in Wales for tourists, with 11.7 million visitors in 2006, and provides 8,400 full-time jobs in the sector.

History
The partnership was established in 2002 to serve tourism businesses in South East Wales by investing in tourism in the region. CRT is one of four regional partnerships across Wales initiated by Visit Wales with the aim of receiving devolved resources and responsibilities for many aspects of tourism marketing and development. The other partnerships South West Wales, Mid Wales and North Wales.

Area served
Capital Region Tourism serves the local authority areas of: Blaenau Gwent, Bridgend, Caerphilly, Cardiff, Merthyr Tydfil, Monmouthshire, Newport, Rhondda Cynon Taf, Torfaen and Vale of Glamorgan. CRT also works with Brecon Beacons Tourism.

Partners
The stakeholders, partners and key groups of the partnership include: 
Cardiff & Co
TTFW (Tourism Training Forum for Wales)
WTA (Wales Tourism Alliance)
WLGA (Welsh Local Government Association)
SWAP (Southern Wales Attractions Partnership)
Department of Enterprise, Innovation and Networks
National Assembly for Wales
WAVA (Welsh Association of Visitor Attractions)
WASCO (Welsh Association of Self Catering Operators)
Wales Official Tourist Guides Association
Visit Cardiff
Visit Wales.

The cultural and environmental organisations it works with include: Countryside Council for Wales, Arts Council of Wales, Welsh Sports Council, National Museum & Galleries of Wales, Herian, Audiences Wales, Churches Tourism Network Wales and Cynon Culture.

References

Tourism in Wales
Organisations based in Cardiff
Tourism agencies
Tourism organisations in the United Kingdom